Dr. Cecil Vincent "Tommy" Thomas September 17, 1892, Perry, Ohio – November 28, 1947, Cleveland, Ohio), was a distinguished American educator, administrator, and the first president of Fenn College.

Fenn College
It is unclear when he first was officially given the title of President of Fenn College.  The first reference to it is in a letter Thomas wrote on May 1, 1934.

Personal life
He was married to Sylvia Mae Thomas (née Moore). He died in his office at Fenn College on November 28, 1947.

References 

Presidents of Cleveland State University
1892 births
1947 deaths
People from Perry, Ohio
20th-century American academics